Leonardo Octavio Bordad López (born June 30, 1979 in Montevideo, Uruguay), known as Leonardo Bordad, is an Uruguayan former professional footballer who played as a goalkeeper.

Notes

External links
 
 

1979 births
Living people
Uruguayan footballers
Association football goalkeepers
Club Almagro players
Miramar Misiones players
Club Sol de América footballers
Club Olimpia footballers
Uruguayan expatriate footballers
Uruguayan expatriate sportspeople in Argentina
Expatriate footballers in Argentina
Uruguayan expatriate sportspeople in Paraguay
Expatriate footballers in Paraguay